ι Chamaeleontis, Latinized as Iota Chamaeleontis, is a single star in the southern circumpolar constellation of Chamaeleon. It is visible to the naked eye as a dim, yellow-white hued point of light, having an apparent magnitude of about 5.3. Based upon parallax measurements, this star is around 188 light years away from the Sun, but it is drifting closer with a radial velocity of −4 km/s.

Spectra of the star taken in different years have been given types of F3IV/V and F5III, leading to a mean published type of F3/5 III/V, with the suspicion that the spectrum is variable. It is an F-type star, likely an evolving subgiant. It is 1.2 billion years old with 3.6 times the Sun's radius. The star has a high rate of spin with a projected rotational velocity of 130 km/s, which is giving it an oblate shape with an equatorial bulge some 9% larger than the polar radius.

References 

F-type subgiants
Circumstellar disks

Chamaeleon (constellation)
Chamaeleontis, Iota
CD-80 00329
046107
082554
3795